Ursus is Latin for bear.  It may also refer to:

Animals
Ursus (mammal), a genus of bears

People
 Ursus of Aosta, 6th-century evangelist
 Ursus of Auxerre, 6th-century bishop
 Ursus of Solothurn, 3rd-century martyr
 Ursus (praefectus urbi) of Constantinople in 415-416
 Reimarus Ursus, an astronomer and imperial mathematician to Rudolf II
 Ursus, a pen-name of Ambrose Bierce

Fictional characters
 Ursus, the bodyguard of Ligia, a minor character in the novel Quo Vadis
 Ursus, a character in Victor Hugo's novel The Man Who Laughs
 General Ursus (Planet of the Apes), a character in Beneath the Planet of the Apes
 Ursus (film character), a character in a series of 1960s Italian adventure films

Arts
 Ursus (film), 1961 Italian film

Science and technology
 Ursus (journal), a scientific journal published by the International Association for Bear Research and Management
 Ursus Factory, Polish manufacturer of heavy vehicles
 Ursus A, a series of Polish lorries and buses from the 1920s
 The Ursus, or Samochód pancerny wz. 29, a model of Polish armored car

Others
 Ursus (beer), a Romanian beer
 Ursus (vodka), an Icelandic vodka
 Ursus, Warsaw, a borough of Warsaw, Poland

See also
 Ursa (disambiguation)